The 2017 Women's Hockey Asia Cup was the ninth edition of the Women's Hockey Asia Cup. It was held from 28 October to 5 November 2017 in Kakamigahara, Gifu, Japan. The winner of this tournament qualified for the 2018 World Cup in England.

India won their second title, after beating China in the final.

Qualified teams

Results
All times are local (UTC+9).

First round

Pool A

Both matches were scheduled for 29 October, but were moved due to heavy rain.

Pool B

Second round

Quarterfinals

Fifth to eighth place classification

Crossover

Seventh and eighth place

Fifth and sixth place

First to fourth place classification

Semi-finals

Third and fourth place

Final

Final standings

See also
2017 Men's Hockey Asia Cup

References

External links
Official website

Women's Hockey Asia Cup
Asia Cup
Hockey Asia Cup
International women's field hockey competitions hosted by Japan
Kakamigahara, Gifu
Sport in Gifu Prefecture
Hockey Asia Cup
Hockey Asia Cup
Asia Cup